Starobinsky inflation is a modification of general relativity used to explain cosmological inflation.

History
In the Soviet Union, Alexei Starobinsky noted that quantum corrections to general relativity should be important for the early universe. These generically lead to curvature-squared corrections to the Einstein–Hilbert action and a form of f(R) modified gravity. The solution to Einstein's equations in the presence of curvature squared terms, when the curvatures are large, leads to an effective cosmological constant. Therefore, he proposed that the early universe went through an inflationary de Sitter era. This resolved the cosmology problems and led to specific predictions for the corrections to the microwave background radiation, corrections that were then calculated in detail. Starobinsky originally used the semi-classical Einstein equations with free quantum matter fields. However, it was soon realized that the inflation was essentially controlled by the contribution from a squared Ricci scalar in the effective action

This action corresponds to the potential  in the Einstein frame. As a result, the inflationary scenario associated to this potential or to an action including an  term are referred to as Starobinsky inflation. To distinguish, models using the original, more complete, quantum effective action are then called (trace)-anomaly induced inflation.

Observables
Starobinsky inflation gives a prediction for the observables of the spectral tilt  and the tensor-scalar ratio : 
where  is the number of e-foldings since the horizon crossing.

See also
 Alternatives to general relativity
 Inflation (cosmology)

References

Physical cosmology
General relativity